Nitzhonot ("victories") is a form of Goa trance, fused with Uplifting trance, that emerged during the mid-late 1990s in Israel.

Overview
Nitzhonot blends hard pulsating basses, sometimes referred to as "laserkicks", with the Eastern melodies typical for Indian Goa trance from 1996 and 1997. The tracks are usually in a range of 145–155 BPM.

At the height of its popularity, nitzhonot reached mainstream success in Israel. The most notable artist from this genre is Eyal Barkan, who released his album Good Morning Israel in 1998. It became the first trance record that achieved gold status in its home country, selling more than 20,000 copies (bootleg versions accounted for 80,000). Other artists from Greece and Israel would also gain popularity that year. In the 2000s, Astrix emerged as another notable Israeli nitzhonot artist.

Before most artists in Israel changed their direction to Full On, artists in Greece rode the tide. At the beginning of the new millennium, nitzhonot, now renamed as uplifting trance (not to be confused with epic trance, also known as "uplifting trance"), would stand up again, rising in popularity. Notable Greek acts included Cyan, Cherouvim, Star Children, Darma, Space Odyssey, Agneton and Dementia.

The uplifting scene in Greece has been silent for years, as very few tracks were produced in the late 2000s, but after 2010, nitzhonot gained fame again, especially in Israel.

References

Goa trance music
Trance genres
Israeli music